was a Japanese samurai of the 16th century. Also known as Shōemon (将右衛門), he served Toyotomi Hideyoshi.

References
Maeda - Miyoshi, samurai-archives.com

Samurai
1528 births
1595 deaths